The former Pacific Gas & Electric Building is a  skyscraper located at 77 Beale Street (at Mission) in the financial district of San Francisco, California. Completed in 1971, the 34 story building was the headquarters for Pacific Gas and Electric Company, the main utility provider for Northern California and parts of Southern California, and has been host to a nesting pair of peregrine falcons since 1987.

History
In June 2020, Pacific Gas & Electric announced that it plans to move its headquarters to the Kaiser Center in Oakland. The move will happen in phases, starting in 2022 and completing by 2026.

In May 2021, Hines agreed to purchase the building for US$800 million. They proposed its address to be 200 Mission Street (instead of 77 Beale Street).

See also

List of tallest buildings in San Francisco

References

Office buildings completed in 1971
Headquarters in the United States
Skyscraper office buildings in San Francisco
Pacific Gas and Electric Company
Financial District, San Francisco
Energy in the San Francisco Bay Area
1971 establishments in California